National Route 494 is a national highway of Japan connecting between Matsuyama, Ehime and Susaki, Kōchi on the island of Shikoku, with a total length of 120.7 km (74.83 mi). of Japan .

References

494
Roads in Ehime Prefecture
Roads in Kōchi Prefecture